The Siege of Ciudad Rodrigo was a successful siege of the Spanish city of Ciudad Rodrigo, between 18 September and 4 October 1707, in which a Franco-Spanish army under command of Alexandre Maître, Marquis de Bay conquered the city.

Ciudad Rodrigo had been besieged and taken on 25 May 1706 by 40.000 Portuguese, Dutch and English soldiers under command of Henri de Massue, Earl of Galway and António Luís de Sousa, 2nd Marquis of Minas.

On 18 September 1707, a Franco-Spanish army under command of Alexandre Maître, Marquis de Bay arrived at the city and laid siege. The siege lasted until 4 October when the walls were breached and the city was stormed and forced to capitulate. 
Some 2,100 prisoners were taken. A total of 300 soldiers were killed and some 600 wounded.

Sources  
 
 Ciudad Rodrigo en la guerra de sucesion

Ciudad Rodrigo (1707)
Ciudad Rodrigo (1707)
Battles of the War of the Spanish Succession
1707 in Spain
Conflicts in 1707
18th century in Spain
Sieges of the War of the Spanish Succession
Battles in Castile and León
History of the province of Salamanca